Frederick Shenstone Woods (1864–1950) was an American mathematician.

He was a part of the mathematics faculty of the Massachusetts Institute of Technology from 1895 to 1934, being head of the department of mathematics from 1930 to 1934 and chairman of the MIT faculty from 1931 to 1933.

His textbook on analytic geometry in 1897 was reviewed by Maxime Bocher.

In 1901 he wrote on Riemannian geometry and curvature of Riemannian manifolds. In 1903 he spoke on non-Euclidean geometry.

Works
 1901: 
 1905: 
 1907: (with Frederick H. Bailey) A course in mathematics via Internet Archive
 1917: (with Frederick H. Bailey) Analytic geometry and calculus via Internet Archive
 1922: (with Frederick H. Bailey) Elementary calculus via Internet Archive
 1922: Higher geometry

Non-Euclidean geometry

Following Wilhelm Killing (1885) and others, Woods described motions in spaces of non-Euclidean geometry in the form:

which becomes a Lorentz boost by setting , as well as general motions in hyperbolic space

Notes

External links
 

1864 births
1950 deaths
Mathematicians from Massachusetts
Massachusetts Institute of Technology School of Science faculty
American textbook writers